Jahnstadion is the name of several stadiums in Germany, including:

 Jahnstadion (Bottrop), a stadium in Bottrop
 Jahnstadion (Göttingen), a stadium in Göttingen
 Friedrich-Ludwig-Jahn-Sportpark, a stadium in Berlin
 Friedrich-Ludwig-Jahn-Stadion, a stadium in Herford
 Jahnstadion (Regensburg), a stadium in Regensburg
 Jahnstadion, Rheda-Wiedenbrück, a stadium in Rheda-Wiedenbrück
 Jahnstadion (Rheine), a stadium in Rheine
 Jahnstadion (Mönchengladbach), a stadium in Mönchengladbach
 Jahnstadion (Marl), a stadium in Marl
 Jahnstadion (Neubrandenburg), a stadium in Neubrandenburg
 Jahnstadion (Neuss), a stadium in Neuss